Jacob Kiraz (born 23 November 2001) is a Lebanon international rugby league footballer who plays as a er for the Canterbury-Bankstown Bulldogs in the NRL.

Background
Kiraz was born in Sydney, New South Wales, Australia and is of Lebanese descent. 

He played his junior rugby league for the Berala Bears and later St Johns Eagles.

Playing career

Early career
In 2015, Kiraz was a member of the Canterbury-Bankstown Bulldogs under-15 Summer Development Squad. In 2018, he was a member of the under-17 Winter Development squad. In November 2018, he was named in the St. George Dragons SG Ball Cup train-on squad. On 6 February 2019, he was named in the team's final squad, and played eight games and scored three tries during the season.

2019
In June, Kiraz signed a three-year contract with the North Queensland Cowboys, beginning in 2020.

On 22 June, at 17-years old, Kiraz made his international Test debut for Lebanon, coming off the bench in their 58–14 loss to Fiji at Leichhardt Oval. He set up his side's third try just two minutes after coming onto the field. 

On 10 October, he was named in Lebanon's 2019 Rugby League World Cup 9s squad. Kiraz played just one game in the tournament before being disqualified for being under the age of 18. While the International Rugby League allows players 16 or older to play in Test matches, the National Rugby League, who ran the tournament, stipulates that you must be 18 to play. Kiraz, who would not turn 18 until November.

2020
In 2020, Kiraz moved to Townsville but played just one game for the Townsville Blackhawks Under-20s side before moving back to Sydney after the competition was cancelled due to the COVID-19 pandemic.

2021
In 2021, Kiraz joined the Newcastle Knights on an NRL development contract.

2022
After not being able to break through for an NRL debut at the Newcastle club, Kiraz returned to the Canterbury-Bankstown Bulldogs ahead of the 2022 season.

In round 7 of the 2022 NRL season, Kiraz made his NRL debut for Canterbury against Brisbane. He scored his first try in first grade the following week against the Wests Tigers.

In round 20, Kiraz scored a hat-trick in Canterbury's 24-10 victory over Newcastle.

Kiraz played 15 games for Canterbury in the 2022 season scoring six tries. The club would finish 12th on the table at the end of the season.

2023
In round 2 of the 2023 NRL season, Kiraz scored two tries for Canterbury in a 26-12 upset victory over Melbourne.

References

External links
Canterbury-Bankstown Bulldogs profile
NRL profile

2001 births
Living people
Australian rugby league players
Australian people of Lebanese descent
Lebanon national rugby league team players
Canterbury-Bankstown Bulldogs players
Rugby league centres
Rugby league players from Sydney